Arnold W. Donald (born 17 December 1954) is an American businessman. He was the chief executive officer (CEO) of Carnival Corporation & plc from July 2013 to August 2022, when he became vice-chairman.

Life and career
Donald was born and raised in New Orleans, Louisiana. He was raised Catholic and graduated from St. Augustine High School.

Donald holds a bachelor's degree in economics from Carleton College in 1976 and a bachelor's degree in mechanical engineering from the McKelvey School of Engineering atWashington University in St. Louis in 1977. He received an MBA from the University of Chicago Graduate Booth School Of Business in 1980.

Donald started his career, working at Monsanto in St. Louis and served various positions over 23 years, including as the president at Monsanto's nutrition and consumer sectors and senior vice president of the parent company.

Donald joined Carnival as CEO in July 2013.

In August 2022, Donald was succeeded as CEO by Josh Weinstein, COO of Carnival; Donald was vice-chairman for the duration of the transition, later moving to a consultant role through 2025.

References

1954 births
Living people
American chief executives of travel and tourism industry companies
Businesspeople from New Orleans
Carleton College alumni
Carnival Corporation & plc people
McKelvey School of Engineering alumni
St. Augustine High School (New Orleans) alumni
University of Chicago Booth School of Business  alumni
African-American Catholics